Soldini is a town (comuna) in the . It is part of the Greater Rosario metropolitan area, and lies 127 km south from the provincial capital (Santa Fe). It has a population of about 2,800 inhabitants.

The town was founded in 1891 by Domingo Aran, and became officially a comuna on 17 January 1921.

References
 
 

Populated places in Santa Fe Province